Liaoning Province Shiyan High School, originally called Northeast Shiyan School, is a public high school located in Huanggu District, in the city of Shenyang, Liaoning, China. It is the number one ranked high school in Shenyang, ranking by high school entrance examination grades.

History
Liaoning Province Shiyan High School was founded on May 4, 1949. It is the only Secondary School that is operated under direct supervision of the Department of Education in Liaoning Province. The first appointed headmaster was the Vice-governor and notable educationist Mr. Che Xiangchen.

In July 2007, the School was selected as an Olympic Model Schools in Liaoning Province.

Notes

External links
 Official website of Liaoning Experimental High School

Education in Shenyang
High schools in Liaoning
Buildings and structures in Shenyang
Educational institutions established in 1949
1949 establishments in China